Don Leicht (October 12, 1946 – January 22, 2021) was a visual artist who has worked as a painter and sculptor in the Bronx, New York City for over forty years. Leicht has had one person exhibitions in New York, Sweden and (Germany) and is an early figure in the New York City downtown scene in the 1970s, and in the subsequent Street Art and Graffiti movements.

Fashion Moda

Fashion Moda is most often associated with graffiti art and its acceptance into the art world through such figures as John Fekner, Jean-Michel Basquiat, Jenny Holzer, and Keith Haring. In 1981, Leicht participated in Fashion Moda's annual South Bronx exhibition, and the following year in From The Monkey To The Monitor an installation by Fekner, Leicht and Fred Baca which included a live performance by Phoebe Legere.

Charlotte Street

In August 1980, John Fekner and Don Leicht worked together on an outdoor project located at the site of the People's Convention held at Charlotte Street in the South Bronx. Held on August 8–10, the People's Convention was an alternative and direct response to the National Convention of the Democratic Party being held at Madison Square Garden in New York City. Fekner's stenciled messages included Decay, Broken Promises, Falsas Promesas, Last Hope, Broken Treaties and Save Our School were succinct and dramatic in size; Leicht's Birdfeeders were small-scaled and intimate painted sculptures for the children of the neighborhood. Their work transversely complemented each other with two different and distinct approaches that identified and drew attention to the existing conditions of the immediate Black and Latino communities, as well the concerns of Native American Indians. Presidential candidate Ronald Reagan stood amidst the abandoned buildings on August 5, 1980 promising to rebuild the area, as did his predecessor President Jimmy Carter in October 1977. The area has seen improvements through the rebuilding initiatives of Mayor Ed Koch, Ed Logue's SBDO Charlotte Street Gardens, and the ongoing efforts of MBD Community Housing Corporation, SoBro and other newer partnerships and financial institutions.

Collaborations

Leicht began collaborating with Queens artist John Fekner at P.S. 1 where they shared a studio in 1976. In 1982, they began a series of work and installations using steel, cut metal, aluminum and automotive paints based on Nishikado's Space Invaders arcade game with the statement: Your Space Has Been Invaded-Our Children are Fighting a Terrible War. Whole families are being sent to Battlescreen. Their Beauty's Only Street Deep was installed at the Wooster Collective's 11 Spring Street street art 2006 exhibition in NYC. In 1978, Leicht painted outdoors in Fekner's Detective Show in Gorman Park in Queens which included the words street museum on the invitational card.

Reviews
O’Brien, Glenn, Artforum magazine, 1983

Review of From the Monkey to the Monitor, Fashion Moda, South, Bronx

The Wooster Collective said, "For us, John Fekner's pioneering stencil work is as important to the history of the urban art movement as the work of artists like Haring, Basquiat. It was artists like Fekner, Leicht, Hambleton and others who truly held down the scene back in the early 80's."

In 1983, art writer Glenn O'Brien in a review in Artforum magazine states, "Leicht's piece consists of a sequence of creatures that exist only on a video screen- Pac Man, Donkey Kong, and other Atari-type stable mates. Leicht has cut the forms of these leisure demons from heavy aluminum plate and enameled them with their normal, unnatural colors. But each creature has also been abraded, scratches in the enamel showing the metal underneath. One geometric thing – an abstracted dog? an "Imperial Walker"? – has been scratched with a message like a toilet-stall graffito or the "Pray" scratched on the metal of New York City phone booths.

Selected bibliography

 Gumpert, Lynn, curator, New Work New York at the New Museum, Exhibition catalog essay, January 30 – March 25, 1982. p. 12–15
 Howze, Russell, Stencil Nation: Graffiti, Community, and Art, Manic D Press, San Francisco, CA, 2008, 
 Kahane, Lisa, Do Not Give Way to Evil, Photographs of the South Bronx, 1979–1987, powerHouse books, a Miss Rosen edition, Brooklyn, NY, 2008, 
 Lippard, Lucy, Get The Message-A Decade of Social Change, Penguin Group (USA) Incorporated, 1985

Gallery

Notes

External links

 Don Leicht website
 Hyperallergic "The Emergence of Real Pop Art: Jeffrey Deitch & Street Art" 
 John Fekner website
 Wooster Collective
 Detective Show, Gorman Park, Jackson Heights, NY 1978
 BLK River, Vienna Austria  John Fekner & Don Leicht/The Stanley Cup is missing

American contemporary painters
Public art
American graffiti artists
1946 births
Living people
Culture jamming
20th-century American painters
American male painters
21st-century American painters
21st-century male artists
People from the Bronx
Painters from New York City
Lehman College alumni
20th-century American sculptors
20th-century male artists
American male sculptors
Sculptors from New York (state)